The first season of the police procedural drama RIS Delitti Imperfetti was originally broadcast between January 12 and February 16, 2005 on Canale 5.

Plot 
In the first season, Captain Riccardo Venturi's men must face a sadistic and intelligent bomber who builds miniature bombs by hiding them in various everyday objects. From the very first episodes, for some strange reason, "the Bomb Man" (so nicknamed by the media) targets Captain Venturi, trying to hit him by inserting a bomb into an energy drink. He will be able to get to the heart of the RIS like no one had ever done before, sending a bomb hidden inside an artifact. At the same time the RIS of Parmadeals with "simpler cases" such as serial killings, "family crimes", rapes, kidnappings and cases inspired by the recent Italian news. Along with the story there are also subplots that see the private life of the members of the team as protagonist: the death of Venturi's parents, the rape of Anna, the accident of Francesca De Biase, the daughter of Marshal Vincenzo De Biase, and love relationships among colleagues. The series culminates with the latest bomb that the bomber sends to the RIS to try to kill Anna. But Venturi's intervention at the last moment saves her by destroying the laboratory.

Cast 
Lorenzo Flaherty as Captain Riccardo Venturi
Nicole Grimaudo as Lieutenant Anna Giordano
Filippo Nigro as Lieutenant Fabio Martinelli
Stefano Pesce as Lieutenant Davide Testi
Ugo Dighero as Sergeant Vincenco De Biase
Giulia Michelini as Francesca De Biase
Gea Lionello as Dr. Claudia Morandi, ME
Giamperdo Judica as Lieutenant Bruno Corsini
Nino D' Agata as General Giacomo Tosi

Episodes

References 

2005 American television seasons